Ladew v. Tennessee Copper Company, 218 U.S. 357 (1910), was a United States Supreme Court case involving jurisdiction over a suit involving a citizen from another state beyond the Court's jurisdiction, suing a New Jersey Corporation, another out of state citizen. The Court asserted that under the statute jurisdiction was improper because neither party was a citizen in the jurisdiction of the Circuit Court. The Court followed the decision in Wetmore v. Tennessee Copper Company another case decided later that same year.

References

External links
 

United States Supreme Court cases
United States Supreme Court cases of the White Court
1910 in United States case law
Diversity jurisdiction case law
Copper mining in the United States
Copper Basin (Tennessee)